Cape Le Grand National Park is a national park in Western Australia,  south-east of Perth and  east of Esperance. The park covers an area of 
The area is an ancient landscape which has been above sea level for well over 200 million years and remained unglaciated. As a result, the area is home to many primitive relict species.
Established in 1966, the park is managed by the Department of Parks and Wildlife.
The name Le Grand is from one of the officers on L'Espérance, one of the ships in the 1792 expedition of Bruni d'Entrecasteaux.

Geography 
The largely granite shoreline and white sand beaches are picturesque features of the area. The park is a used for fishing, off-roading, tourism, and hiking.
Beaches within the Park include those at Lucky Bay, Rossiter Bay, Hellfire Bay, Le Grand Beach, and Thistle Cove.
The islands and waters to the south of the park are known as the Recherche Archipelago Nature Reserve, another protected area of the Recherche Archipelago and nearby coastal regions. The Cape Arid National Park is located to the east.
The southwest section of the park is dominated by rock outcrops of gneiss and granite. These form a distinctive chain of peaks including Mount Le Grand (345 m), Frenchman Peak (262 m), and Mississippi Hill (180 m, named after the Mississippi, a French whaler).
Further inland, the park comprises mostly heath-covered sandplain, interspersed with swamps and pools of fresh water.

Wildlife 
The sandplains support dense stands of banksias (Banksia speciosa and Banksia pulchella).

Other flora that can be found around the park include species of Melaleuca, Grevillea, sheoak, Christmas tree and grass trees.
Wildflower blooms peak in the austral spring, lasting until October and species such as blue china orchid Cyanicula gemmata, Diuris corymbosa, Hakea laurina, Thysanotus sparteus and Thelymitra macrophylla are represented within the park.

Fauna that are commonly found within the park include bandicoots, pygmy honey possums, ring tailed possums, quenda and western grey kangaroos.
Some of the relict species with gondwanan links that are found within the park include species of legless lizard, like the common scaly-foot Pygopus lepidopodus, and Delma fraseri, Delma australis and Aprasia striolata. The ancient, although non-gondwanan, blind snake Ramphotyphlops australis is also found within the park.
Endemic frogs found within the area include the quacking frog Crinia georgiana, the banjo frog Limnodynastes dorsalis and the humming frog Neobatrachus pelobatoides.

Facilities 
Facilities include toilets, barbecues, campsites, tables, sheltered areas, walk trails, information bays, and water tanks. Two full-time rangers are residents of the park. Check the Cape LeGrand Campground website for booking details.  During busy holiday periods, there is a 'camp host' couple who helps manage the site.

Gallery

See also

 Protected areas of Western Australia
 
 Lucky Bay, a beach near the park

References

National parks of Western Australia
Goldfields-Esperance
Protected areas established in 1966